Al Nahda Sporting Club, or Renaissance in French, was a football club based in the Mar Elias district of Beirut, Lebanon. Supported by the Orthodox community, they were founded in 1926 as Lebanon's first football club.

Nahda have won the inaugural Lebanese Premier League in 1933–34, as well as of the first edition of the Lebanese FA Cup in 1937–38. They are also the first team to have won a domestic double (1946–47), and have won a total of five league titles and four FA Cups. In the 1990s the club faced bankruptcy, and were forced to fold.

History 
Nahda was established on 3 February 1926, by Elias Nakhle Boutrous, Emile Raffoul Boutrous, and Elias Moubarak, as Lebanon's first ever football club. The club won the inaugural Lebanese Premier League in the 1933–34 season; their team consisted of: Elias Nakhle Boutrous, Edmond Rbeiz, Anis Al Lala, Emile Khoury, Georges Karam, Khalil Salmon, Georges Boukhazi, Gebran Boukhazi, Adel Sidani, Youssef Sidani, Jacques Chehab, Jimmy Chehab, Samir Sursuk, Avram Moussa, Elias Moubarak, Toufic Raffoul Boutrous, and Ibrahim Andraos.

Nahda also won the first edition of the Lebanese FA Cup in 1937–38. They are the first team to win a domestic double, in 1946–47. Between the 1930s and 1940s, Nahda was won five league titles, and four FA Cups.

In 1956 Al Nahda were relegated to the Lebanese Second Division after losing 10–0 on aggregate against Second Division winners Sagesse (9–0 and 0–1) in the play-off game held at the Beirut Municipal Stadium. They failed to gain promotion back to the Premier League, staying in the Second Division until the 1990s, when Nahda faced bankruptcy and were forced to fold.

Stadium 
Nahda established their stadium in 1927, in the Mar Elias district of Beirut, Lebanon. In 1930, the club added wooden stands for 2,000 fans. On 22 December 1946, the club's president Ibrahim Saad put the first cornerstone for a new stadium at the Al Manara district of Ras Beirut, Beirut. The stadium cost £L300,000, or around £stg.34,000.

Chairmen history

Honours

Domestic 
 Lebanese Premier League
Winners (5): 1933–34, 1941–42, 1942–43, 1946–47, 1948–49
 Lebanese FA Cup
Winners (4): 1937–38, 1940–41, 1944–45, 1946–47
Runners-up (1): 1942–43

References

Bibliography 

 

 
Football clubs in Lebanon
Defunct football clubs in Lebanon
Association football clubs established in 1926
Association football clubs disestablished in the 1990s